There Is No Competition 2: The Grieving Music EP is an EP by American rapper Fabolous. The EP was released on August 31, 2010.

Background
The EP was released in promotion for his sixth studio album, Loso's Way 2: Rise to Power. The EP is the retail packaging of his mixtape There Is No Competition 2: The Funeral Service. Fabolous stated he went into the studio to record new material for the EP.

Track listing

Sample credits
"Lights Out" – Contains elements from "Jigga That Nigga" by Jay-Z.

Charts

References

2010 debut EPs
Def Jam Recordings EPs
Fabolous albums
Albums produced by Ryan Leslie
Albums produced by Lex Luger
Albums produced by Jahlil Beats
Sequel albums
Albums produced by Kid Cudi